Hinduism is the second largest religious affiliation in Bhutan, covering about 22.6% of the population, according to the Pew Research Center 2010. It is followed mainly by the ethnic  Lhotshampa. The Shaivite, Vaishnavite, Shakta, Ganapathi, Puranic, and Vedic schools are represented among Hindus. Hindu temples exist in southern Bhutan, and Hindus practice their religion in small- to medium-sized groups. About 75% of the population of Bhutan are Buddhist.

History

According to a legend it was ruled by a Cooch-Behar king, Sangaldip, around the 7th century BC, but not much is known prior to the introduction of Tibetan Buddhism in the 9th century, 

There was existence of Hinduism in Bhutan  during reign of Kamarupa Kingdom.

Festival
The main festival of Bhutanese Hindus is Dashain. It is the only recognized Hindu public holiday in Bhutan. It was recognized as a holiday in 2015 by the King of Bhutan. He also celebrated Dashain with Hindus that year. The first nine days of Dashain symbolize the battle which took place between the different manifestations of Durga and Mahishasura. The tenth day is the day when Durga finally defeated him. For other Hindus, this festival symbolizes the victory of Ram over Ravan as recounted in the Ramayana. They also prepare Sel roti during Dashain.

Hindu Dharma Samudaya
The Hindu Dharma Samudaya of Bhutan (HDSB) is the Hindu religious organization, established in 2009. It is registered with the Chhoedey Lhentshog, the Commission for Religious Organizations of Bhutan. HDSB is dedicated to promote spiritual traditions and practices of Sanathan Dharma in Bhutan so to foster and strengthen human values. Its head office in the capital city, Thimphu, the organization is managed by a Board of Directors of volunteers comprising representatives from Hindu priests and other HDSB members who are elected at an annual general meeting.

Persecution of Hindus

Ethnic cleansing 
Ethnic cleansing of Lhotshampa Hindus was carried out by King Jigme Singye Wangchuk of Bhutan during the 1990s. In the early 1990s, several thousands of Bhutanese residents in southern Bhutan were ethnically cleansed by the authorities under the provisions of the amended Citizenship Act of 1985, because they followed the Hindu religion and culture, and had mixed Himalayan ethnicity, with one parent of Nepali origin. Nepal, like India, shares common Hindu and Buddhist traditions, but the majority of Bhutan's population is exclusively Buddhist and the royal family has demonstrably shown a pronounced bias against its Hindu citizens who have been settled there for centuries.

Refugees and diaspora 

After the purge of the 1990s began, Bhutanese Hindus were forced to live in refugee camps set up by the UN High Commission for Refugees United Nations High Commissioner for Refugees (UNHCR) in eastern Nepal in 1992. With help of UNHCR and WHO, the majority of Bhutanese refugees are resettled to the United States, Canada, Australia, and European countries. There is a small number of refugees living in camps in Nepal still hoping to see their motherland for more than 30 years.

Discrimination 
The government provided financial assistance for the construction of Buddhist temples and shrines and state funding for monks and monasteries. NGOs alleged that the government rarely granted permission to build Hindu temples; the last report of such construction was in the early 1990s, when the government authorized the construction and renovation of Hindu temples and centers of Sanskrit and Hindu learning and provided state funds to help finance the projects. The government argued that it was a matter of supply and demand, with demand for Buddhist temples far exceeding that for Hindu temples. The Government stated that it supported numerous Hindu temples in the south, where most Hindus reside, and provided some scholarships for Hindus to study Sanskrit in India.

See also
 Bhairabkunda Shiva Mandir, Bhutan
 Freedom of religion in Bhutan
Hinduism in Southeast Asia
Religion in Bhutan

References

External links 

 

 
Bhutan